According to the taxonomy of Bouchet & Rocroi (2005), Strubellioidea was a taxonomic superfamily of sea slugs, mostly marine gastropod mollusks within the informal group Opisthobranchia.

However, Schrödl & Neusser (2010) redefined the taxonomy of Acochlidiacea in 2010.

Taxonomy
Families within the superfamily Strubellioidea according to the taxonomy of Bouchet & Rocroi (2005) were:
Family Strubelliidae
Family Pseudunelidae

References

Obsolete gastropod taxa